Bjorne Island, meaning 'Bear Island', is an island in NE Greenland. Administratively it belongs to the Northeast Greenland National Park.

It is the only island in the inner Kaiser Franz Joseph Fjord system.

History
This island was first mapped and named Björnön by Alfred Gabriel Nathorst in 1899 during the Swedish Greenland Expedition in search of survivors of S. A. Andrée's Arctic balloon expedition of 1897.

Geography
It is a rocky islet, rising north of Cape Weber, the easternmost end of Andrée Land.

See also
List of islands of Greenland

References

Uninhabited islands of Greenland